Verrückt (German meaning "crazy" or "insane") was a water slide located at the Schlitterbahn Kansas City water park in Kansas City, Kansas, United States. The ride was designed at the park, led by John Schooley with assistance from park co-owner Jeff Henry. It was featured on an episode of Xtreme Waterparks on the Travel Channel in June 2014 shortly before the ride opened. Verrückt permanently closed in 2016 following a fatal incident involving the decapitation of Caleb Schwab, the 10-year-old son of Kansas state legislator (and later Secretary of State of Kansas) Scott Schwab.

Verrückt was originally scheduled to open in June 2013, but difficulties during various stages of construction and safety testing resulted in several delays. Sandbags loaded into rafts during testing went airborne. Verrückt was well-received upon opening, winning a Golden Ticket Award from Amusement Today in 2014.

After Schwab's death, amusement park safety laws were updated to require state inspection of all attractions. It was later revealed that at least 13 other people had suffered non-fatal injuries from hitting the netting above the slide. Criminal charges led to the arrests of several individuals, including Schooley and Henry. The charges were ultimately dismissed with the finding of multiple procedural issues with the case's presentation by the Kansas Attorney General. The incident's aftermath, however, resulted in a rapid decline of Schlitterbahn's reputation and financial standing, resulting in the closure of the park in September 2018. Verrückt was dismantled two months later.

History

Background
Original plans for Schlitterbahn Kansas City, the first Schlitterbahn Waterparks site outside Texas, called for a  complex including hotels and resort areas. Officials in Wyandotte County, Kansas, where it was to be built, were delighted when the company announced the plans in 2005, seeing this as the culmination of efforts to draw residents of the Kansas City metropolitan area to spend their disposable income in Kansas rather than Missouri. State legislators from the area passed a law allowing Schlitterbahn to self-inspect its attractions without state oversight as it did in Texas, unlike all other amusement parks in Kansas, which were subject to state inspection.

However, the full plans never came to fruition. The Great Recession two years later forced many amusement park operators, including Schlitterbahn, to scale back their plans and focus on making their existing parks profitable in the challenging economy. Schlitterbahn Kansas City was reduced to a  park without any lodging, and was not open for a full season until 2010. It was successful, but not to the degree Schlitterbahn and co-owner Jeff Henry had originally expected.

Construction
In November 2012, Schlitterbahn announced plans for the creation of the world's tallest and fastest water slide at its Kansas City park, to open in mid-2013. No name was given during the announcement, while specifications on the height of the ride were kept secret in order to ensure that the completed ride would set a world record for its creation.

The water slide was spontaneously conceived by Henry at a trade show, after a team from Travel Channel's Xtreme Waterparks asked what he was working on. Initial attempts to pitch the idea to vendors at the show failed, so Henry decided to build the slide himself, enlisting John Schooley as the ride's lead designer. Henry had described the new ride to the Travel Channel crew as a "speed blaster", a term he had likewise improvised. He and Schooley knew that Schlitterbahn had to live up to the hype Henry had created and design something previously unheard of. "Basically we were crazy enough to try anything", Schooley later recalled.

Henry pressed his design team to complete the ride at a faster pace than usual; many staff worked almost around the clock. Calculations that were normally allotted three to six months instead had five weeks to be completed. As they began testing, rafts kept going airborne on the ride's large bottom hump.

In November 2013, the ride was officially named Verrückt, the German word for crazy or insane, with the opening date pushed back until the start of the park's 2014 season. The Guinness Book of World Records named Verrückt the world's tallest water slide in April 2014, before it was even finished. At , it surpassed Kilimanjaro at Aldeia das Águas Park Resort in Brazil. When the park opened, delays in construction and testing of the ride led to its opening date being pushed back to June 5, and then June 29, after the lower portion of the ride was rebuilt, to coincide with a television special about the ride; the park later canceled this opening date and two days of media previews following further delays.

An unnamed lifeguard at the park told Esquire magazine in 2019 that the park primarily conducted some of the later tests after operating hours, with only select employees  usually those who had been with the company for the longest  allowed to watch. He further stated, "The only time I saw the slide run successfully was on the Travel Channel episode, but I wouldn't even call that successful", he recalled, because the raft in that case got stuck on the second hump. Sandbags on the raft frequently went airborne at that point, as in some leaked viral videos. "I told my friends and family it was only a matter of time until someone died on Verrückt", the lifeguard said.

A safety consultant hired by the park shortly before Verrückt's scheduled opening told Henry it was unfinished and unsafe. When complete, he recommended that only riders aged 16 and over be allowed on the ride. Henry, who had no formal engineering education, decided age 14 was better. Just before the opening, however, he dropped any age limit.

Operation
Verrückt was eventually completed and officially opened on July 10, attracting national media coverage. Among the first riders was then-Kansas Governor Sam Brownback. The riders who had seen the videos of  sandbags flying off the rafts went on anyway. One local judge told Esquire later that she rode the water slide ten times that day, and an employee who had loaded the sandbags during testing said he went down twenty times over its first two days. "That should tell you something about how I felt about it", he said. However, Henry and Schooley, while watching riders that day, noted how many rafts seemed to be going airborne on the lower hump, into the emergency netting meant to keep them on the slide.

Two months later, Verrückt was voted the world's "Best New Waterpark Ride" at the 2014 Golden Ticket Awards. However, at least thirteen riders suffered non-fatal injuries, such as concussions or slipped and herniated discs  many of which had long-term effects  after either hitting the netting or being thrown into it. After a Missouri man thrown from the raft suffered facial injuries in June 2016, the park's operations manager allegedly attempted to cover up the incident, telling lifeguards what to write in their reports; it is believed that this happened with other accidents.

Even some uninjured riders were unnerved by Verrückt. A Kansas City man who had made a point of riding due to favorable experiences with the Texas Schlitterbahn parks recalled having to grab the raft's auxiliary straps when the Velcro straps holding him came loose after the first drop; he was thankful that his son had used the weight limit as an excuse not to ride. A local woman whose boyfriend held her in the raft likewise noted to Esquire that the netting and hoops on the lower hump showed signs of many human collisions.

Design
Verrückt was designed to consist of two drops, the initial being a 17-story plunge, with a five-story uphill midsection. The ride was designed to accommodate three-person rafts, each weighing  and carried up by conveyor to the top of the slide, while riders climbed 264 steps to the top.

Because it was beyond the  that zoning codes permitted, the design required  a variance. After the announcement of the ride's height and the certification of its world record on April 25, 2014, Schlitterbahn tore down most of the lower part of the ride, in order to rebuild and re-engineer it because sandbags had flown off the ride during testing. As a result, the second drop was changed from 45 degrees to 22 degrees, an extra  was added to the uphill portion of the ride to slow the rafts, and a series of metal hoops supporting netting were added into areas where rafts had flown off in early testing.

Fatal incident
On August 7, 2016, Caleb Schwab, the 10-year-old son of Kansas state representative Scott Schwab, died while riding Verrückt. The raft he was riding went airborne during the ascent of the second hump and impacted a metal support of the netting, decapitating him. The other two passengers, both women, were injured in the incident – one suffered a broken jaw, while the other suffered a facial bone fracture and needed stitches. In the immediate aftermath, Schlitterbahn Kansas City was closed pending an inspection. Although the park reopened three days later, the ride remained closed.

Their findings revealed that the use of the metal brace and netting system in the design, along with the use of hook and loop straps to restrain the riders, violated guidelines set by ASTM F-24 Committee on Amusement Ride and Devices. According to the guidelines, Verrückt should have incorporated the use of a rigid over-the-shoulder restraint for riders, and an upstop mechanism to prevent the rafts from going airborne.

Aftermath
After Scott Schwab spoke to his fellow legislators about his son's death and its effect on him, they voted to change the law that had allowed Schlitterbahn to self-inspect, requiring that all the state's amusement park attractions be regularly inspected by the state. In November 2016, Schlitterbahn announced that Verrückt would be demolished following the conclusion of a criminal investigation. Settlements involving the other two riders who were injured in the accident were undisclosed.

In July 2018, a judge approved a plan by the park to disassemble Verrückt beginning the following September. The ride's teardown was placed on hold indefinitely in August 2018, resulting from ongoing discussions in multiple court cases that were filed after the incident. The park eventually began dismantling the ride in November 2018, and the work to remove the ride was completed within two months. The park did not operate the following season, and Schlitterbahn's reputation and finances were negatively impacted.

With the dismantling of Verrückt, Kilimanjaro regained its title as the world's tallest water slide.

Criminal charges
On March 23, 2018, a grand jury issued an indictment against Schlitterbahn and Tyler Austin Miles, former director of operations, charging them with involuntary manslaughter, aggravated battery, aggravated child endangerment, and interference with law enforcement. The indictment accused the park of negligence, concealing design flaws, and downplaying the severity of previous injuries reported on the ride.

The 2018 indictment against Schlitterbahn wrote that Henry and Schooley "lacked technical expertise to design a properly functioning water slide" and did not perform standard engineering procedures or calculations on how the slide would operate. Instead they used "crude trial-and-error methods" to test its performance, out of haste to launch the ride. According to court documents, Schooley conceded that, "If we actually knew how to do this, and it could be done that easily, it wouldn't be that spectacular."

Three days later, on March 26, Henry was arrested in Cameron County, Texas, in connection with the incident. One day later, on March 27, the Kansas Attorney General's office released a new indictment against Henry, Schooley, and Henry & Sons Construction Company — privately owned by Schlitterbahn — charging them with second-degree murder in addition to seventeen other felonies. Schooley was arrested at Dallas/Fort Worth International Airport after returning from a trip to China on April 2, 2018. The defendants were arraigned in April 2018, and the first criminal trial began in October.

On February 22, 2019, criminal charges were dismissed against Henry, Schooley, and Miles because inadmissible evidence had been presented to the grand jury. The judge's ruling reprimanded state attorneys for presenting the Xtreme Waterparks episode to jurors as fact, instead of as a "fictional and dramatized version of events created for entertainment purposes", and expert witnesses for claiming that the designers of the slide were negligent in not following ASTM standards, though the law at the time did not require that those standards be followed.

Notes

References

External links

2014 establishments in Kansas
2016 disestablishments in Kansas
Amusement rides introduced in 2014
Amusement rides that closed in 2016
Buildings and structures in Kansas City, Kansas
Water rides
World record holders
Amusement park accidents
Accidental deaths in Kansas
2016 controversies in the United States
Best New Ride winners